{{DISPLAYTITLE:C40H56}}
The molecular formula C40H56 (molar mass: 536.87 g/mol) may refer to:

 Carotenes
 α-Carotene
 β-Carotene
 γ-Carotene
 δ-Carotene
 ε-Carotene
 Lycopene

Molecular formulas